Jones vs. Racetrac Petroleum Inc. is a court case involving the wrongful termination based on the discrimination of Race, Harassment in the work place, Retaliation for reporting discrimination, and Retaliation of taking FMLA (Family Medical Leave Act) which is a violation of federal law in the United States of America. This Case is currently being heard in the Middle/Eastern District of Louisiana Federal Court before District Judge Carl Barbier. Plaintiff Lance Jones is the worker that was wrongfully terminated based on the allegations of discrimination and Racetrac Petroleum Inc. is the Defendant that is accused of committing the violations.

References 
Docket Number: 3:11-cv-00286 Middle District of Louisiana Federal Court
http://www.law360.com/cases/4dbb05b8df27084c48000001

External links 

Discrimination in the United States
United States district court cases
United States District Court case articles without infoboxes